William Henry Flack (March 22, 1861  – February 2, 1907) was a U.S. Representative from New York.

Career
Flack attended public schools. He became interested in lumbering and tanning. He had some family members in Indiana west of downtown Indianapolis in an area known as Flackville.  He was Supervisor of the town of Waverly, New York for seven years and chairman of the board for two years.
He was the county clerk of Franklin County from 1898 to 1902 and reelected in 1900. He served as chairman of the Republican county committee 1898–1902. He served as trustee of the village of Malone and elected president of said village in 1902.

Flack was elected as a Republican representative to the United States House of Representatives for the congressional district formed from the 26th District (Essex, New York, Franklin, New York, Clinton, New York and St. Lawrence, New York) to the Fifty-eighth and Fifty-ninth Congresses and served from March 4, 1903, until his death. He was interred in Morningside Cemetery.

See also
List of United States Congress members who died in office (1900–49)

References

 William Henry Flack, late a representative from New York, Memorial addresses delivered in the House of Representatives and Senate frontispiece 1907

External links
 

1861 births
1907 deaths
People from Franklin County, New York
Republican Party members of the United States House of Representatives from New York (state)
19th-century American politicians